Kafr Kanna (Kafr Kanā) is an Arab town in the Galilee, part of the Northern District of Israel. It is associated by Christians with the New Testament village of Cana, where Jesus turned water into wine. It has a religiously mixed population of Muslims and Christians from different denominations.

A Jewish village during antiquity, Kafr Kanna is mentioned in an extant 9th-century Islamic marble stele. Under Crusader rule, from the 12th to mid-13th centuries, it was a casale (country estate). Kafr Kanna had become a large village by 1300, during Mamluk rule. It flourished as one of the largest localities in Palestine and one of the two market towns of the Safed Sanjak under Ottoman rule in the 16th century, when its population was mostly Muslim with a significant Jewish minority. By the 19th century, its population was roughly equal parts Muslim and Christian, a state which persisted through British Mandatory rule (1917-1948). Since 1948, it is a part of Israel.

History

Ancient period
Archaeological excavations by the Israel Antiquities Authority uncovered remains dating from the Neolithic to the Mamluk periods. Evidence for a large Early Bronze Age settlement was excavated adjacent to the perennial Kanna spring, overlaying a site dating to the Early Chalcolithic Period. A fortification wall indicates that the settlement was fortified.

Kana was mentioned in the Amarna letters.

Classical period 
During the first century CE, Kafr Kanna was a Jewish village. It was mentioned by the Roman-Jewish historian Josephus in his The Life of Flavius Josephus.

On the outskirts of the modern town is the tomb of the Jewish sage, rabbi Simeon ben Gamliel, who became the Nasi (president) of the Sanhedrin in 50 CE. His tomb has remained a Jewish pilgrimage site over the centuries.

Middle Ages
In the early 9th century, under Abbasid rule, Abu Salih Khayr al-Khadim, a eunuch of Caliph al-Mu’tazz b’illah, left all his property in Kafr Kanna and another Galilee village, Kfar Tavor (then called Kafr Tabaria), to a waqf (religious endowment). The endowments were supposed to be eternal, but were presumably ended by the conquest of the Crusaders in 1099.

The Persian traveler Nasir-i-Khusraw visited the village in 1047 CE and described the place in his diary:

During the Crusader period, the Persian traveler Ali of Herat wrote that one could see the Maqam of Jonas, and also the grave of his son, at Kafr Kanna. This was repeated by the Syrian geographer Yaqut al-Hamawi, although he only wrote of the tomb as being that of Jonas's father. The name Casale Robert was used by the Crusaders, beside variations of the Arab name. In August 1254 Julian, the lord of Sidon, sold it to the Knights Hospitaller.

Around 1300, during Mamluk rule, Kafr Kanna was described as being a large village, in which lived the chiefs of various tribes. The head tribe is called Kais al-Hamra ("Kais the Red.") According to the chronicler al-Dimashqi, the district al-Batuf, called "the Drowned Meadow", belonged to the village. Al-Dimashqi further remarked that the waters of the surrounding hills drained into the area, flooding it; as soon as the land was dried up grain was sown.

Ottoman Empire

Under the rule of the Ottoman Empire, the village flourished in the 16th century, as it lay on the western trade route between Egypt and Syria. High taxes of different kinds were levied on the busy market. Among other things it traded in cloths, produced in Galilee for international consumption. Public baths and ovens were also taxed. In 1533, Ottoman officials recorded the population as 147 households, and by 1596 (or rather 1548) it grew to 475 Muslim taxpayers  (426 households and 49 bachelors) and 96 Jewish taxpayers (95 households and 1 bachelor), making it the sixth most populous locality in Palestine at the time. The villagers paid a fixed tax-rate of 25% on agricultural products, including wheat, barley, olive trees, fruit trees, cotton, goats and beehives, in addition to occasional revenues and a market toll; a total of 56,303 akçe. At the time, Kafr Kanna was one of the few market villages in the Safed Sanjak (district of Safed) and the second largest after the city of Safed. It was also the only locality in the sanjak besides Safed to have a public bathhouse.

A map from Napoleon's invasion of 1799 by Pierre Jacotin  showed the place, named as Cana, and David Roberts' The Holy Land, Syria, Idumea, Arabia, Egypt, and Nubia illustrated the same in two separate lithographs. Edward Robinson's 1841 Biblical Researches in Palestine wrote that "The monks of the present day, and all recent travellers, find the Cana of the New Testament, where Jesus converted the water into wine, at Kefr Kenna", however he argued that Cana's location was in fact at the ruins known as Kana el Jalil (Cana of Galilee). In the 1881 PEF's Survey of Western Palestine (SWP), described it as a stone-built village, containing 200 Christians and 200 Muslims. A population list from about 1887 showed that  Kefr Kenna had about  830 inhabitants; "the greater part Christians."

British Mandate

In the 1922 census of Palestine conducted by the British Mandate authorities, Kufr Kenna had a total population of 1,175; 672 Muslims and 503 Christians, of the Christians, 264 were Greek Orthodox, 82 Roman Catholics, 137 Melkites (Greek Catholics) and 20 Anglicans. The population had increased at the 1931 census to 1,378; 896 Muslims and 482 Christians, in a total of 266 houses.

In the  1945 statistics, the population was 1,930; 1,320 Muslims and 610 Christians,  while the total land area was 19,455 dunams, according to an official land and population survey. Of this, 1,552 were allocated for plantations and irrigable land, 11,642 for cereals, while 56 dunams were classified as built-up areas.

Israel
During the 1948 Arab–Israeli War, Kafr Kanna was captured by units of Israel's 7th Brigade in the second half of Operation Dekel (July 15–18, 1948). On July 22, 1948, the two priests, Giuseppe Leombruni (Catholic) and Prochoros (Greek Orthodox), and the Christian mayor surrendered Kafr Kanna peacefully to the advancing Haganah troops, ensuring that the population could remain in the village. Kafr Kanna remained under martial law until 1966.

On 30 March 1976, a resident of Kafr Kanna, Muhammad Yusuf Taha, was one of six people killed by the Israeli army during Land Day demonstrations.

In November 2014, there were clashes for some days because Israeli police killed one Israeli Arab, who attacked a police van with a knife. The police said that they had fired warning shots before shooting him but relatives said he was shot in "cold blood" and images from closed-circuit television (CCTV) showed a police officer shooting at the man while he was backing away.

The mayor of the town is Mujahed Awadeh.

Religious significance

The town is identified by Christians as the town of Cana, where Jesus performed a miracle at the Marriage at Cana (John 2:1–12). According to the Catholic Encyclopedia of 1914, the identification of Kafr Kanna with Cana dates back to at least the 8th century. However, the general view starting from the 12th-century placed Cana at Khirbet Kana, a site  to the northwest of Kafr Kanna. Later, the traditional identification with Kafr Kanna reemerged strongly in the mid-14th-century and until the present day.

Cana is also mentioned as the home town of the Apostle Bartholomew, as "Nathanael of Cana" in John 21:2.

The main churches in Kafr Kanna are the Franciscan Wedding Church, the Greek Orthodox Church of St George and the Baptist Church. Near the two is the (usually closed) Roman Catholic Chapel of the Apostle Bartholomew (Nathanael).

Demographics
Kafr Kanna achieved local council status in 1968. In 2006, there were 18,000 residents, The population grew to 20,832 in the 2014 census. As of 2014, Christians formed about 11% of the population.

As is the case with many other mixed Muslim-Christian towns in the region, the Christians generally tend to live in the oldest part of town. In Kafr Kanna—and in Kafr Yasif and 'Abud, among others—there are two ancient nuclei in the town: the earlier one where Christians live, and another (also hundreds of years old) where Muslims live.

Sport
Hapoel Kafr Kanna and F.C. Tzeirei Kafr Kanna plays in Liga Alef (the third tier). Beitar Kafr Kanna both play in Liga Bet (the fourth tier). Maccabi Kafr Kanna, which dissolved in 2014, have played at the second level in the past.

Archaeology
In 2001, remains of a 4th-century BCE pottery kiln that produced everted rim storage jars were found adjacent to the Kanna spring.

Notable people

 Abdulmalik Dehamshe, resident, former Knesset member, United Arab List
 Wasil Taha, resident, Knesset member, Balad party

See also
 Arab localities in Israel

References

Bibliography

  
  
 

 (pp. 168 -182

 
 
 (p. 351 ff)

External links
Welcome To Kafr Kanna
Survey of Western Palestine, Map 6: IAA, Wikimedia commons 

 
Archaeological sites in Israel
Arab localities in Israel
Arab Christian communities in Israel
Local councils in Northern District (Israel)